Alex's Lemonade Stand Foundation (previously known as Alex's Lemonade Stand and currently abbreviated as ALSF) is an American pediatric cancer charity founded by Alexandra "Alex" Scott (January 18, 1996 – August 1, 2004), who lived in Connecticut before moving to Pennsylvania. Scott suffered from neuroblastoma.

History
This foundation was started in 2005 by Alex's parents.

In November 2019, Alex's Lemonade Stand Foundation was named Non-Profit Organization of the Year by The Chamber of Commerce For Greater Philadelphia.

References

External links
 

Pediatric cancers
Cancer charities in the United States
Non-profit organizations based in Pennsylvania
Medical and health organizations based in Pennsylvania
Organizations established in 2005